Šašavarlija is a village in the municipality of Štip, North Macedonia.

History 
According to the Bulgarian ethnographer Vasil Kanchov it was a pure Turkish Muslim village at the beginning of the 20th century. The famous Turkish retail company Pehlivanoğlu surname hails from this village, and in an interview on 2009 they were fluent in Macedonian  Turkish Government has opened the new school of the village in 2014.

Demographics
According to the 2002 census, the village had a total of 108 inhabitants. Ethnic groups in the village include:

Macedonians 23
Turks 85

References

Villages in Štip Municipality
Turkish communities in North Macedonia